Rise and Shine is a studio album by British reggae band Aswad, released in 1994 through Bubblin' Records. It peaked at number 38 on the UK Albums Chart and at number 69 on the Dutch Album Top 100.

The album spawned two singles: "Shine" and "Warriors", both made it to the UK Singles Chart at No. 5 and No. 33 respectively. Its lead single, "Shine", became the group's second biggest hit after their version of "Don't Turn Around".

Track listing

Personnel 

Aswad
 Angus "Drummie Zeb" Gaye – lead vocals, drums, backing vocals, programming, mixing
 Brinsley "Dan" Forde – lead vocals, guitar, backing vocals
 Dennis Anthony "Tony Gad" Robinson – lead vocals, bass, keyboards, backing vocals, programming
with:
 Paul "Jazzwad" Yebuah – drums
 Carlton Courtney "Bubblers" Ogilvie – drums, bass, keyboards, backing vocals
 Michael "Cool Walk" Martin – bass, keyboards
 Stanley "Soon Come" Andrew – guitar, backing vocals, programming
 John David Holliday – guitar, backing vocals
 Joseph Crawley "Jo" Cang – guitar, backing vocals
 Alan Glass – keyboards, programming
 Winston Rollins – horns
 Eddie "Tan Tan" Thornton – horns
 Brian Edwards – horns
 Janet Kay – backing vocals
 Viveen Wray – backing vocals
 Trevor Steel – backing vocals
 Solomon – deejay
 Anthony "Chukki Star" Williams – deejay
 Yootie General – deejay
Technical
 Peter "Mash" Morgan – programming, engineering, mixing
 James Reynolds – engineering (track 2)
 Tony Cousins – mastering

Charts

Certifications

References

External links

1994 albums
Aswad (band) albums
Reggae albums by British artists